Co-option or coöption is a process of appointing members to a group, or an act of absorbing or assimilating.

Co-option or coöption may also refer to:

 Co-option, in evolutionary biology, the shift in function of an adaptation - see exaptation
 Co-option (biology)

See also
 Cultural appropriation